Sebewaing can refer to a location in the United States:

 Sebewaing Brewing Company, a defunct brewer of Sebewaing Beer, in Sebewaing, Michigan.  It was briefly known as "The Michigan Brewing Company.
 Sebewaing Township, Michigan
 Sebewaing, Michigan, a village within the township
 Sebewaing River, in Michigan